Yuki Tsunoda (Japanese: 角田 裕毅, Tsunoda Yūki, ; born 11 May 2000) is a Japanese racing driver who is racing for Scuderia AlphaTauri in Formula One. He is the first Formula 1 driver born in the 21st century.

Early career

Karting 
Born in Sagamihara, Kanagawa, Tsunoda started his professional karting career in 2010, joining the JAF Junior Karting Championship, before moving to the regional class in 2013 and to the national class in 2014.

Japanese Formula 4 
In the same year he made his single-seater debut in the F4 Japanese Championship with the Sutekina Racing Team for a one-off event in Suzuka. He claimed his first podium with 2nd in the first race and finished 4th in the second race.

In 2017, Tsunoda started his first full season of single-seater racing in the F4 Japanese Championship while also contesting in the regional East series of the JAF F4 Japanese Championship. Tsunoda won the title of the regional championship while finishing third in the national Formula 4 championship. He contested both championships with Honda.

Tsunoda continued to race in Japanese F4 in 2018 with the Honda Formula Dream Project team. Tsunoda claimed the title amassing seven wins.

FIA Formula 3 and Euroformula Open 

With Honda tying up with Red Bull in Formula One, Tsunoda also joined the Red Bull junior team alongside the Honda programme. At the end of 2018, Tsunoda was announced to join Jenzer Motorsport in the newly announced FIA Formula 3 Championship. He finished 9th in the championship with three podiums and a win, scoring all of the Jenzer team's points during the season.

Tsunoda also competed for Motopark in the Euroformula Open Championship, following the cancellation of Formula European Masters. After a second-place finish in the first race at Paul Ricard and achieving third place in the Pau Grand Prix, Tsunoda claimed his maiden championship win in the second race at Hockenheim.

FIA Formula 2 Championship 
In the beginning of 2020, Honda announced that Tsunoda will join Carlin to race in the FIA Formula 2 Championship. During the 2020 season he took three wins, four pole positions, seven podiums and finished 3rd in the championship with 200 points.

Formula One 
In August 2020, Scuderia AlphaTauri Honda Formula One team principal Franz Tost announced that Tsunoda would drive for the team in the end-of-season rookie test at Abu Dhabi in December 2020. He had his first drive in a 2018-spec car at the Autodromo Internazionale Enzo e Dino Ferrari in Imola, Italy. He again tested Formula One machinery at Imola in January 2021, but this time, he drove an AlphaTauri-liveried Toro Rosso STR14, Toro Rosso's 2019 car.

AlphaTauri (2021–)

2021 

Tsunoda replaced Daniil Kvyat and partnered Pierre Gasly at the team for the 2021 season. His car number is 22.

At the season-opening , Tsunoda finished in ninth place. After the race, Ross Brawn, Formula One's technical director, hailed Tsunoda as "F1's best rookie for years". He went on to retire from the race with an electrical failure. He finished the race seventh. He reached Q3 again at the  but received a grid penalty for impeding Valtteri Bottas.

He started the race sixteenth, improved to seventh place at the finish line, and was promoted to sixth after Sebastian Vettel's disqualification.

From this position, he went on to finish fourth and gain 12 points, just ahead of Gasly in fifth, thereby improving his best Formula One result thus far. With those points, Tsunoda secured 14th place in the drivers' championship and ended the year on 32 points.

2022 

Tsunoda and Gasly were retained by AlphaTauri for the  season. Tsunoda qualified sixteenth and finished eighth at the season-opening . At the  Tsunoda finished seventh, ahead of teammate Gasly, having qualified sixteenth. He described the race as the best of his Formula One career.

A streak of twelve races without scoring points followed. He was running seventh at the  until he was forced to pit for repairs after a DRS failure. He qualified eighth for the  but a first-lap collision with Esteban Ocon resulted in Tsunoda's eventual retirement. At that event, he received another penalty for failing to slow for yellow flags in practice. He then crashed out of the  having qualified tenth.

Tsunoda scored a point at the  where he started nineteenth, gained five places on the first lap and finished tenth. He was running eleventh at the  but was eliminated in a collision with Daniel Ricciardo. He ended the season seventeenth in the drivers' championship with 12 points to Gasly's 23.

2023 
On 22 September 2022, AlphaTauri announced Tsunoda would stay with the team through the 2023 season. Nyck de Vries will replace Alpine-bound Gasly as Tsunoda's new teammate.

Racing record

Career summary 

 Season still in progress.

Complete F4 Japanese Championship results
(key) (Races in bold indicate pole position; races in italics indicate points for the fastest lap of top ten finishers)

Complete FIA Formula 3 Championship results
(key) (Races in bold indicate pole position; races in italics indicate points for the fastest lap of top ten finishers)

† Driver did not finish the race but was classified as he completed over 90% of the race distance.

Complete Macau Grand Prix results

Complete Toyota Racing Series results 
(key) (Races in bold indicate pole position) (Races in italics indicate fastest lap)

Complete FIA Formula 2 Championship results
(key) (Races in bold indicate pole position) (Races in italics indicate points for the fastest lap of top ten finishers)

‡ Half points were awarded as less than 75% of the scheduled race distance was completed.

Complete Formula One results 
(key) (Races in bold indicate pole position) (Races in italics indicate fastest lap)

 Season still in progress.

References

External links

 

2000 births
Living people
Japanese racing drivers
People from Kanagawa Prefecture
Euroformula Open Championship drivers
FIA Formula 3 Championship drivers
FIA Formula 2 Championship drivers
AlphaTauri Formula One drivers
Japanese Formula One drivers
Motopark Academy drivers
Jenzer Motorsport drivers
M2 Competition drivers
Carlin racing drivers
Toyota Racing Series drivers
Hitech Grand Prix drivers
Japanese F4 Championship drivers
Japanese expatriate sportspeople in Italy